Adriana "Diana" van der Plaats (born 12 August 1971) is a former freestyle swimmer from the Netherlands, who competed in two consecutive Summer Olympics for her native country, starting in 1988. There she won the silver medal with the Dutch 4×100 m freestyle relay team, behind East Germany, after swimming in the qualifying heats. In the final she was replaced by Conny van Bentum. Three years later Van der Plaats captured the title in the 4×100 m freestyle relay at the 1991 European Aquatics Championships in Athens, Greece, and won the bronze in the 4×200 m freestyle relay.

References
 Dutch Olympic Committee

1971 births
Living people
Dutch female freestyle swimmers
European Aquatics Championships medalists in swimming
Olympic silver medalists for the Netherlands
Olympic swimmers of the Netherlands
Sportspeople from Utrecht (city)
Swimmers at the 1988 Summer Olympics
Swimmers at the 1992 Summer Olympics
Medalists at the 1988 Summer Olympics
20th-century Dutch women
21st-century Dutch women